Marina Pavlovna Suprun (born 17 August 1962) is a retired Russian rower who won four medals in the eights at the world championships of 1985–1991. She finished ninth in the coxed fours at the 1988 Olympics and fourth in the eights at the 1992 Games.

References

1962 births
Living people
Olympic rowers of the Soviet Union
Olympic rowers of the Unified Team
Rowers at the 1988 Summer Olympics
Rowers at the 1992 Summer Olympics
Russian female rowers
World Rowing Championships medalists for the Soviet Union
Soviet female rowers